Marie A. (Panosetti) Lederer (born October 24, 1927) is an American politician.

She is a 1945 graduate of Little Flower Catholic High School for Girls in Philadelphia, Pennsylvania. She also attended Temple University. She was a member of the Pennsylvania Democratic State Committee and served as an assistant to the Deputy Pennsylvania Auditor General.

She became the fourth member of the Lederer family to represent Philadelphia in the Pennsylvania House of Representatives. Her husband William and father-in-law Miles were both in the House. Another family member, Raymond F. Lederer, served in the House prior to becoming a Congressman. She retired prior to the 2006 elections.

References

External links
 official PA House profile (archived)
 official Party website (archived)

1927 births
Possibly living people
Democratic Party members of the Pennsylvania House of Representatives
Women state legislators in Pennsylvania
Politicians from Philadelphia
Temple University alumni